HMS Undine was a U-class submarine and lead vessel of her class, which is sometimes called the Undine class as a result. The submarine entered service in 1938. Undine performed war patrols during the Second World War and was scuttled after being damaged by German minesweepers off Heligoland on 7 January 1940.

Construction and career
Undine was built by Vickers Armstrong, Barrow-in-Furness. She was laid down on 19 February 1937 and was commissioned on 21 August 1938 with the pennant number N48.

At the onset of the Second World War, Undine was a member of the 6th Submarine Flotilla. From 26–29 August 1939, the flotilla deployed to its war bases at Dundee and Blyth.

Sinking
Undine was on her fourth war patrol in January 1940 when her sonar failed due to a leak. At 0940 on 7 January, she was attacked by German auxiliary minesweepers M-1201, M-1204 and M-1207. She unsuccessfully attacked the leading vessel, but the minesweepers counter attacked and forced her to dive. After five minutes with no further attacks, she raised her periscope and was heavily damaged by an explosion. The order to abandon ship was given. The crew scuttled the Undine while abandoning ship.

Notes

References
 
 
 

 

British U-class submarines
Ships built in Barrow-in-Furness
1937 ships
World War II submarines of the United Kingdom
Lost submarines of the United Kingdom
World War II shipwrecks in the North Sea
Maritime incidents in January 1940
Submarines sunk by German warships